Petr Korda defeated Arnaud Boetsch 6–3, 6–4 in the final to secure the title.

Seeds
The text in italics indicates the round in which that seed was eliminated.

  Michael Stich (quarterfinals)
  Karel Nováček (first round)
  Sergi Bruguera (second round)
  Petr Korda (champion)
  Alexander Volkov (quarterfinals)
  Jonas Svensson (second round)
  Anders Järryd (semifinals)
  Cristiano Caratti (first round)

Draws

Key
Q - Qualifier
WC - Wild card

Finals

Section 1

Section 2

External links
 1991 Berlin Open Draw

Singles